The Kokerboom–Auas High Voltage Power Line, also Keetmanshoop–Dordabis High Voltage Power Line, is a high voltage electricity power line, under construction, connecting the high voltage substation at Kokerboom, near Keetmanshoop, in the ǁKaras Region to another high voltage substation at Auas, near Dordabis, in the Khomas Region of Namibia.

Location
The 400 kilo Volt power line starts at the NamPower 400kV substation at Kokerboom, near the city of Keetmanshoop, in Namibia's ǁKaras Region.

The power line travels in a general northerly direction to end at another 400kV substation, also owned by NamPower, located at Auas, near the town of Dordabis, in the Khomas Region of Namibia.

The power line passes through three Namibian regions; namely ǁKaras Region, Hardap Region and Khomas Region.

Overview
The power line is being developed as part of plans to improve power delivery, reliability and stability of the Namibian electricity grid. This will ensure the safe and reliable importation of power from the South African utility, Eskom. In the future, when NamPower has excess electricity to sell to the Southern African Power Pool, this transmission line ensures, efficient means of transporting that power to South Africa and to its final destination. In addition, Namibia being a large country, with urban centres sparsely spaced out, transmission of power at these high voltages, reduces technical losses over those long distances.

History
In 1981, a 220kV line served as the main backbone of the Namibian electricity grid and the means by which the country imported power from neighboring South Africa. Circa 1999, a single circuit 400kV transmission line was strung between the substation in Aries, South Africa to Auas outside Windhoek in Namibia to meet demand and stabilize the network.

It is anticipated that by 2023, that network will be insufficient to meet Namibia's expanding electricity needs. A new 400kV single circuit power line between Kokerboom and Auas is in the processes of development, to "ensure system reliability" and provide increased demand and expanded area of coverage.

Associated power lines

Construction
Power Line Africa (Pty), a local company is the main contractor on this project, at a reported cost of N$660 million (US$45.5 million). Construction is expected to begin in 2021 and last approximately 2 years.

See also
Energy in Namibia
List of power stations in Namibia

References

External links
 The Auas High-voltage Transmission Line in Namibia, Supported by a Swedish Concessionary Credit As of 2013.

High-voltage transmission lines in Namibia
Energy infrastructure in Africa
Energy in Namibia
Buildings and structures in Khomas Region
Buildings and structures in Hardap Region
Buildings and structures in ǁKaras Region